Hybolasius genalis is a species of beetle in the family Cerambycidae. It was described by Broun in 1903. It is known from New Zealand. It contains the varietas Hybolasius genalis var. tumidellus.

References

Hybolasius
Beetles described in 1903